Stefano Agostini (born 3 January 1989) is a professional road cyclist, who last rode for . He joined the team in 2011 as a stagiaire before signing on as a neo-pro for the 2012 season.

On 20 September 2013 the UCI announced that Agostini was provisionally suspended for an adverse analytical finding for 0.7 nanogram per millilitre clostebol in an out-of-competition test taken on 21 August 2013. He was also fired by the  team. He was given a 15-month suspension for doping, ending 20 November 2014.

Achievements

2006
1st Stage 2 Tre Ciclistica Bresciana
2007
1st Stage 2 Tre Ciclistica Bresciana
2009
5th Trofeo Gianfranco Bianchin
2010
1st San Vendemiano
1st  National U23 Road Race Champion
2011
5th Giro del Belvedere
6th Trofeo Alcide De Gasperi
3rd Overall Girobio
1st Mountains classification
1st Stages 4 & 7
8th GP di Poggiana

References

External links

Stefano Agostini profile at Liquigas-Cannondale

1989 births
Doping cases in cycling
Living people
Italian male cyclists
Italian sportspeople in doping cases
Sportspeople from Udine
Cyclists from Friuli Venezia Giulia